Josh Ward (born 15 August 2003) is an Australian rules footballer who plays for  in the Australian Football League (AFL). He was recruited by Hawthorn with the 7th draft pick in the 2021 AFL draft.

Early life
Ward began his Australian rules football career at the Fitzroy Junior Football Club in the Yarra Junior Football League, back in 2012. Ward then was selected to play for the Northern Knights in the 2021 NAB League Boys season. Ward played well during his time with the Knights, averaging 30.2 disposals and being named the captain in the NAB League Boys Team of the Year. Ward was also selected as a representative for the Vic Metro squad to play in a match against Vic Country, where he was selected captain of the team and was one of the best on ground, collecting 29 disposals, two goals and eight clearances. Ward also attended Melbourne Grammar School with future teammate Ned Long. Ward scored well in the draft combine, running a time of 5:57 in the 2km time trial, the second best time in the country. The majority of the media predicted Ward to get selected by Hawthorn in the draft, and this ended up eventuating, with Ward being selected with the Hawks first pick, and 7th overall, in the 2021 AFL draft.

AFL career
Ward impressed early in his first pre-season with the Hawks, being named likely by the media to debut in round one. Coach Sam Mitchell expressed that Ward had been training at a 'high standard'. Ward debuted for the Hawks in their game against  opening round of the 2022 AFL season, collecting 13 disposals and three marks. Despite an ankle injury concern after the game, Ward was available to play the next round. Ward received a Rising Star nomination for his performance against West Coast during round 18.

Statistics
Updated to the end of Round 23 2022.

|-
| 2022 ||  || 25
| 14 || 2 || 2 || 158 || 109 || 267 || 53 || 41 || 0.1 || 0.1 || 11.3 || 7.8 || 19.1 || 3.8 || 2.9 || 0
|- class="sortbottom"
! colspan=3| Career
! 14 !! 2 !! 2 !! 158 !! 109 !! 267 !! 53 !! 41 !! 0.1 !! 0.1 !! 11.3 !! 7.8 !! 19.1 !! 3.8 !! 2.9 !! 0
|}

Honours and achievements
Individual
 AFL Rising Star nominee: 2022

Personal life
Ward is the great grandson of former Hawthorn player Alex Lee. 

During school he also excelled academically as well as in sport achieving an ATAR above 99. He is currently studying at Monash University.

References

External links

2003 births
Living people
Hawthorn Football Club players
Australian rules footballers from Victoria (Australia)
People educated at Melbourne Grammar School
Northern Knights players